Stadio Atleti Azzurri d'Italia, known for sponsorship reasons as the Gewiss Stadium since July 2019 and as Stadio di Bergamo in UEFA competitions, is a stadium in Bergamo, Italy. It is the home of  club Atalanta and has a capacity of 21,000 seats. Atalanta has owned the stadium since 2017, having purchased it from the comune.

Atalanta's youth team also sometimes plays competitive matches at the Gewiss Stadium, most recently the Supercoppa Primavera in 2021. The stadium in Bergamo has also been used as a home ground by local club AlbinoLeffe from 2003 to 2019 (when it moved to Gorgonzola)—a period during which AlbinoLeffe spent nine years in Serie B and met Atalanta on several occasions—and for various matches of the Italy national team.

History

Early years
With the growth of football in the 1920s, Atalanta needed a new stadium with considerably larger capacity than its previous grounds. The new stadium was constructed on Viale Margherita (now Viale Giulio Cesare), replacing a hippodrome that once occupied the site. Construction of the new stadium took one year; it opened in 1928 and cost 3.5 million lire. The stadium was named after fascist Mario Brumana; this was common naming practice in fascist Italy. On 1 November 1928, Atalanta played its first unofficial match at the stadium (a 4–2 victory against Triestina); the stadium was then officially inaugurated on 23 December 1928, when Atalanta defeated La Dominante Genova 2–0 in front of over 14,000 spectators.

After World War II, the stadium was renamed the Stadio Comunale ("Municipal Stadium"), as fascism no longer existed in Italy. Expansion of the stadium began in the years following the war: the construction of a south stand (the Curva Sud) began in 1949, and a second stand at the north end (the Curva Nord) followed during the 1960s, opening in 1971. Later, in 1984, the running track was removed in order to expand the stadium's capacity upon Atalanta's return to Serie A after five years. The club's first match in the 1984–85 Serie A, a 1–1 draw against Inter, had an attendance of over 43,000 spectators, a record attendance for the Stadio Comunale.

Modernization projects 
The Tribuna Giulio Cesare underwent modernization during the early 1990s, and the stadium was renamed the Stadio Atleti Azzurri d'Italia ("Blue Athletes of Italy") in 1994. In 1997, following the death of 22-year-old forward Federico Pisani in a car accident, the Curva Nord was nicknamed the Curva Pisani in his honor. Similarly, the Curva Sud was nicknamed the Curva Morosini in 2012 to posthumously honor 25-year-old youth academy player Piermario Morosini, who died following collapse on the field during a Serie B match between Pescara and Livorno. In 2015, the stadium also expanded its side stands to offer pitchside views only several meters (feet) from the benches, a revolutionary feature of Italian stadiums at the time. This phase of improvements also included improved bench facilities for players and the introduction of luxury boxes atop the grandstand. New seating areas for disabled spectators were also added. At the same time, the press box has been lowered and moved towards the pitch. These improvements came with a reduction in overall capacity by around 3,000 seats. The club paid €2.6 million for the first phase of redevelopment.

On 10 May 2017, Atalanta announced the acquisition of the stadium from the comune for 8.6 million euros, becoming one of only four Serie A clubs to own its home stadium. This acquisition allowed the club to authorize a renovation project for the stadium, for like many Italian stadiums, much of its structure and facilities were considered outdated. This renovation project was also necessary to upgrade the stadium to meet UEFA standards for hosting matches in UEFA competitions. Because the stadium was not ready at the time, Atalanta had to play its Europa League home matches at the Mapei Stadium in Reggio Emilia and its Champions League home matches in its debut season at San Siro in Milan. Despite not playing in Bergamo, though thanks to the additional capacity of San Siro, Atalanta recorded its record home attendance of 44,236 during a Champions League knockout stage match against Valencia on 19 February 2020.

Following a sponsorship agreement with electronics company Gewiss lasting at least until 2025, the stadium was renamed the Gewiss Stadium on 1 July 2019.  On 30 April 2019, a new phase of renovations began with the demolition of the Curva Nord "Federico Pisani" (North Stand). On 6 October 2019, the renovated Curva Nord was inaugurated for Atalanta's home match against Lecce; it has covered seating for over 9,000 spectators. A year later, both side stands underwent modernization and the Curva Sud had temporary seats installed on the concrete. These upgrades allowed Atalanta to play its Champions League matches in Bergamo starting in the 2020–21 season. The final phase will feature a rebuilt Curva Sud (mirroring the rebuilt Curva Nord), which will increase the stadium's capacity to about 25,000, as well as construction of a new underground parking garage and other improvements to the stadium's surroundings. It was originally expected to be completed in 2021, though was delayed until February or March 2022; the start of construction was then further delayed to spring 2024, with expected completion in August of that year. Atalanta will still be able to play its home matches at the Gewiss Stadium during construction.

International matches 
The Gewiss Stadium has also hosted various international matches, though was not selected as a venue in any of the international tournaments hosted by Italy. The Italy national team's most recent match at the Gewiss Stadium was a 1–1 draw with the Netherlands in the UEFA Nations League on 14 October 2020. Prior to this, Italy had not played an international match in Bergamo since 2006; renovations to the stadium in 2019–2020 brought it up to UEFA standards. This match was played in Bergamo as a homage to the city, as it was an early epicenter during the COVID-19 pandemic in Italy.

List of international matches

Notes

References

Bibliography

External links 
 Stadio Atleti Azzurri d’Italia Virtual Tour

U.C. AlbinoLeffe
Atalanta B.C.
Atleti Azzurri d'Italia
Buildings and structures in Bergamo
Sports venues in Lombardy
Tourist attractions in Bergamo
Sports venues completed in 1928
1928 establishments in Italy
Atleti